Yehia Hachem (born 14 July 1981) is a Lebanese former footballer who played as a midfielder.

Club career 
Hachem started his youth career at Nejmeh on 12 April 1995, making his senior debut in the 2000–01 Lebanese Premier League. 

He was named Best Player of the 2004–05 season, and was included in the Team of the Season. Hachem joined Mabarra in the 2008 summer transfer window.

Personal life 
His brother, Bilal, played as a goalkeeper.

Honours
Nejmeh
 Lebanese Premier League: 2001–02, 2003–04, 2004–05
 Lebanese Elite Cup: 2001, 2002, 2003, 2004, 2005
 Lebanese Super Cup: 2000, 2002, 2004
 AFC Cup runner-up: 2005
 Lebanese FA Cup runner-up: 2002–03, 2003–04

Mabarra
 Lebanese Super Cup runner-up: 2008

Individual
 Lebanese Premier League Best Player: 2004–05
 Lebanese Premier League Team of the Season: 2004–05

See also
 List of association football families

References

External links
 
 
 

1981 births
Living people
Footballers from Beirut
Lebanese footballers
Association football midfielders
Nejmeh SC players
Al Mabarra Club players
Lebanese Premier League players
Lebanon international footballers
Asian Games competitors for Lebanon
Footballers at the 2002 Asian Games